Adkins is an unincorporated community in eastern Bexar County, Texas, United States. It is located within the Greater San Antonio metropolitan area.

History
Adkins started out as a flag station on the Galveston, Harrisburg and San Antonio Railway in the 1880s and was named for William Adkins Jones, who was given a land grant for the depot and switchyard that would develop there. A post office was established at Adkins in 1896. There were two churches and 100 people in the community in 1910, which went up to 150 in 1940 with four businesses. Its growth continued with San Antonio developing into a major city, with 241 residents and 32 businesses in 1990.

Adkins is home to Texas Pride Barbecue, where the season 3 finale of Diners, Drive-Ins and Dives was filmed.

Geography

Education
Adkins had its own school in 1910. Today, the community is served by the East Central Independent School District. Salem Sayers Baptist Academy also serves the community.

References

Unincorporated communities in Texas
Unincorporated communities in Bexar County, Texas
Greater San Antonio
Populated places established in 1896